SS Joseph V. Connolly was a Liberty ship built in the United States during World War II. She was named after Joseph V. Connolly.

Construction
Joseph V. Connolly was laid down on 25 May 1945, under a Maritime Commission (MARCOM) contract, MC hull 3143, by J.A. Jones Construction, Panama City, Florida; she was launched on 9 July 1945.

History
She was allocated to South Atlantic Staemship Lines, Inc., on 8 August 1945. She was later taken in tow, 24 January, but broke loose and sank, 29 January.

Wreck location:

References

Bibliography

 
 
 
 
 

 

Liberty ships
Ships built in Panama City, Florida
1945 ships
Maritime incidents in 1948